Jugu, or Jugumetsa, is a village in Rõuge Parish, Võru County in Estonia. It was formerly in the Haanja Parish prior to its merge with Rõuge.

References

Villages in Võru County